Tsogni is a town in Nyanga Province in the south of Gabon. It is the second largest city in the province and twelfth largest city in the country. In 1993 it had a population of 7,226 and in 2012 has an estimated population of 13,725.

References

Populated places in Nyanga Province